Yangmok station is a railway station on the Gyeongbu Line, the most important railway line in South Korea and one of the oldest. It is located between Waegwan station and Gumi station.

It is approximately 25-minutes from Daegu Station, over 2 hours from Busan, and less than 4 hours from Seoul.

References

Railway stations in North Gyeongsang Province